Opera ve vinici is a 1981 Czechoslovak drama film directed by Jaromil Jireš. The film starred actor Josef Kemr.

References

External links
 

1981 films
Czechoslovak drama films
1980s Czech-language films
Films directed by Jaromil Jireš
Czech drama films
1980s Czech films